The Minsk Military Commandant is a regional formation of the Armed Forces of Belarus, based in the capital city of Minsk. It serves the territory of the Minsk Oblast and is one of 6 military commandants in the Belarusian Armed Forces. Units under the command of commandants include military police, honour guards and military bands. It also solves a wide variety of tasks, including combat ones. The commandant's office is located in the military town of Uruchye on 20 Rogachevskaya Street. Previously, it was stationed on the square near Svobody Street.

History 
The Minsk Military Commandant's Office traces its history to November 30, 1917, when by order of the commander-in-chief of the Western Front, Alexander Miasnikian, a military commandant's office of Minsk was created. After the liberation of Minsk by the Red Army on 3 July 1944 in the Minsk offensive, by the directive of the headquarters of the 3rd Belorussian Front, the office of the Military Commandant of the City of Minsk was formed. In 1984, the administration became known as the Military Commandant's Office of the Minsk Garrison. In August 1995, it was reorganized into the Main Military Command of the Armed Forces of the Republic of Belarus, and in 2007, it was reverted to the Minsk Military Commandant.

Structure 
The military commandant's office includes:
 Honor Guard Company
Patrol Company
Guard Service Company
Band of the Honor Guard Company
Military Traffic Police
Department of Inquiry and Search for Servicemen
Guardhouse

Special Units

Honor Guard 
A special unit is a company of the guard of honor. Servicemen ensure the implementation of events such as the welcoming of heads of state and government delegations visiting the Republic of Belarus, as well as participate in national events and celebrations. The scope of the company's tasks also includes participation in the laying of wreaths at monuments and paying military honors at the burial of soldiers.

Unit Band
The Band of the Honor Guard Company of the Minsk Military Commandant was founded on 1 July 1995, as the Military Band of the Minsk Garrison's Office. Since 2018, the band has used chromatic fanfare trumpets in its ranks. For 21 years until 2016, the commander of the band was Serguei Kostiuchenko. It works alongside the honor guard in taking part state visits and other ceremonies in Belarus. The signature march of the band is the Grenadiers March. The band is under the Military Band Service of the Armed Forces. The following have served as directors of the Band of the Honor Guard: 
 Lieutenant Colonel Igor Khelbus (1993–1995)
 Lieutenant Colonel Serguei Kostiuchenko (1995–2005)
 Major Aleksandr Kantsyal (2016–Present)

The company and the band commonly work together on joint visits to different countries.

References 

Military units and formations established in 1917
1917 establishments in Belarus
Military units and formations of Belarus